César Hernández Alfonzo (born July 27, 1977) is a Puerto Rican politician affiliated with the Popular Democratic Party (PPD). He was elected to the Puerto Rico House of Representatives in 2012 to represent District 15.

References

External links
César Hernández Profile on WAPA-TV

Living people
1977 births
People from Hatillo, Puerto Rico
Popular Democratic Party members of the House of Representatives of Puerto Rico
Popular Democratic Party (Puerto Rico) politicians